Kritiri is a village in the municipality of Tyrnavos. The 2011 census recorded 1,415 inhabitants in the village. Kritiri is a part of the community of Tyrnavos.

Population
According to the 2011 census, the population of the settlement of Kritiri was 1,415 people, an increase of almost 25% compared with the population of the previous census of 2001.

See also
 List of settlements in the Larissa regional unit

References

Populated places in Larissa (regional unit)